78 Ursae Majoris is a binary star system in the northern circumpolar constellation of Ursa Major. It is visible to the naked eye as a faint point of light with a combined apparent visual magnitude of 4.93. The system is a candidate member of the Ursa Major Moving Group.

The binary nature of this system was announced by S. W. Burnham in 1894. The pair orbit each other with a period of 105 years and an eccentricity of 0.39.

The primary member, designated component A, has a magnitude of 5.02 and is an F-type main-sequence star with a stellar classification of F2V. It is 785 million years old and is spinning with a projected rotational velocity of 92 km/s. The star has 1.34 times the mass of the Sun and is radiating 5.75 times the Sun's luminosity from its photosphere at an effective temperature of 6,908 K.

The secondary, designated component B, has a visual magnitude of 7.88. It is a G-type main-sequence star with a class of G6V. The star is a suspected variable.

References

F-type main-sequence stars
G-type main-sequence stars
Binary stars
Ursa Major Moving Group

Ursa Major (constellation)
Durchmusterung objects
Ursae Majoris, 78
113139
063503
4931